Jagadguru Kripalu Parishat (JKP), previously known as Sadhna Bhawan Trust, is a charitable religious organisation in India. It was established in 1970 by Jagadguru Shri Kripalu Ji Maharaj and continues to run today under his auspices, with the leadership of the three Presidents he has appointed. The philanthropic activities are designed to ensure and fulfill the vision of Jagadguru Kripalu, who was entitled with Jagadguru on 14 January 1957, and these combined efforts benefit the communities and individuals that need help. To fulfil his vision, Jagadguru Shri Kripalu Ji established three major temples, Bhakti Mandir (Bhakti Dham, Mangarh), Prem Mandir (Vrindavan) and Kirti Mandir (Barsana).

As a non-profit, charitable, educational and spiritual organisation, dedicated to increasing spiritual awareness, JKP works to disseminate the teachings of Jagadguru Shri Kripalu Ji Maharaj throughout the world. Following a clearly defined set of aims and objectives, JKP continues its work in India and globally, focusing on the growing number of people seeking spiritual guidance and support. In addition to this, JKP also works to cater to broader social welfare issues, such as educating and providing medical care to those at a disadvantage in society. This work has increased substantially over the years and JKP's three hospitals now cater to over 450,000 people annually.  Jagadguru Kripalu Parishat was established in 1972 with the aim of teaching the eternal knowledge of the Vedas to seekers globally and helping society by conducting philanthropic and humanitarian efforts.

JKP presidents

Dr. Vishaka Tripathi 
President - JKP Bhakti Dham, Mangarh
Considered by devotees to be an embodiment of pure devotion and love, she inspires them to be fully devoted to the divine service of Hari and Guru. She is a pillar of strength and leadership to the worldwide community and remains fully engrossed in the strategic planning and advancement of all JKP projects. Her presence has been instrumental in empowering JKP volunteers to perform their work enthusiastically. She has preserved Shri Maharaj Ji's memories using various new technologies.

In the year 2016, Dr.Vishaka Tripathi was conferred the Top 50 Indian Icon award for her work and efforts in the field of girls' education and philanthropy.

Dr. Shyama Tripathi 
President, JKP Shyama Shyam Dham, Vrindavan
As an eminent scholar with profound knowledge of Jagadguru Kripalu Bhaktiyoga Tattva Darshan (the body of works propounded by Jagadguru Kripalu Ji Maharaj) and the divine scriptures of Hinduism, she is recognized within the organization for her aptitude in answering any queries in depth. She has also been instrumental in training Shri Maharaj Ji's appointed preachers, who actively spread the knowledge and teachings of Hinduism worldwide. Dr. Shyama Tripathi oversees all the publication works of JKP and is key in guiding all preachers of JKP in spreading Shri Maharaj Ji's message and philosophy throughout the world. She is recognized as a symbol of devotional discipline and hard work.

Dr. Krishna Tripathi 
President, JKP Rangeeli Mahal, Barsana
Considered to be a personification of true worship and devotion, she is acknowledged for her ability to present the ideal ways of life to be adopted by a devotee. Regarded as a personality with childlike innocence, energy and enthusiasm, she is regarded for her skill at instilling hope, vigor and love in all devotees, inspiring them to live and embrace a lifestyle in accordance with Shri Maharaj Ji's philosophy. Dr. Krishna Tripathi is also an eminent scholar with profound knowledge of the divine scriptures of Hinduism. She is popularly known for welcoming questions from spiritual seekers and answering them wholeheartedly to erase doubts in the spiritual aspirants' mind. Recognized for her skill in the art of adornment, she designs the ornate dresses of all deities within the JKP monuments.

JKP Monuments

 Prem Mandir, a religious and spiritual complex situated on a 54-acre site on the outskirts of Vrindavan, Mathura, India. It is dedicated to Shri Radha Krishna and Sita Ram. The monument is built in Italian marble and was opened to public on 17 February 2012. It is the most popular attraction in Vrindavan. and is regarded as one of the best uses of marble in contemporary architecture.
 Prem Bhavan, a 73,000 square feet temple in the form of a pillarless dome. It is being constructed next to Prem Mandir, which will accommodate 25,000 people at a time.
 Bhakti Mandir Mangarh. A stone, hand-carved temple. Standing 108 feet tall and built with pink sandstone, white marble and black granite. The foundation stone of Bhakti Mandir was laid on 26 October 1996, and was inaugurated in November 2005.
 Bhakti Bhavan, Mangarh. A 73,000 square feet temple in the form of a pillarless dome. It is situated next to Bhakti Mandir, and can accommodate 25,000 people at a time.
 Radha Madhav Dham or Shree Raseshwari Radha Rani Temple, USA. The largest Hindu Temple complex in the western world. The temple encompasses about 35,000 square feet (3,300 m2) and is topped by a 90-foot (27 m)-high golden dome. The 90-foot (27 m) high temple dome is made of white and blue granite and gold. The artwork of the temple's shrine was hand-crafted by 15 artisans from South India. Festivals and celebrations at the temple attract up to 8000 people.
 Kirti Mandir, Barsana. The mandir is 111 feet tall (up to its flag) and has twelve pillars made from Emerald Peri Granite. The main pillar which is near the entrance was actually put in place by Shri Kripaluji Maharaj, who is the inspiration and guide behind this breath-taking monument of love. Four delicately carved panels can be found within the temple and there are 24 half pillars where the ‘Sakhis’ are found intricately carved into. They all seem to be smiling in joy as they are praising their beloved Shri Radhe.

JKP Philanthropy 
JKP, under the inspiration, love and guidance of Jagadguru Shri Kripalu Maharaj, will continue to strive in its goal to serve more of the hundreds of thousands of people who are in desperate need of welfare. His appointed JKP presidents are tirelessly moving forward with the goals set out by the founder.

Under the umbrella of JKP, there are three main philanthropic groups that have been established by Jagadguru Shri Kripalu Ji Maharaj. In March 2020, in continuance of the legacy of humanitarian and philanthropic efforts of Jagadguru Shri Kripalu Ji Maharaj, JKP Presidents Sushri Dr. Vishakha Tripathi Ji, Sushri Dr. Shyama Tripathi Ji and Sushri Dr. Krishna Tripathi Ji have confirmed a contribution of Rs100 Lakhs to the Prime Minister's CARES Fund.  This initiative was taken to help the Uttar Pradesh state government in its fight against the COVID-19 outbreak.

JKP Hospitals 
The first, Jagadguru Kripalu Chikitsalaya (JKC), a 100% free charitable hospital group that was established in 2003. The setup of JKC started with hospitals setup in Kunda (November 2003) and then in Barsana (January 2007) which are both in Uttar Pradesh. JKC has helped thousands of sick villagers in these remote locations in India where there is a lack of medical facilities, saving many lives. In September 2015, JKC opened its third facility in Vrindavan, housing important medical equipment, doctors' and nurses' living quarters as well as 100 beds to treat patients. All three hospitals will serve over 450,000 people in Uttar Pradesh ensuring constant medical care through a combination of allopathic, homeopathic, ayurvedic and naturopathic treatments. Till now, Jagadguru Kripalu Chikitsalaya has given medical care to over 4 million impoverished patients from these three locations. These charitable hospitals are providing top class healthcare facilities to the poor and the needy in the villages.

JKP Education 

The second group under JKP is Jagadguru Kripalu Parishat Education (JKPE) which provides 100% free schooling to over 5000 village girls living near and around Kunda. The schooling covers pre-primary to post-graduate levels, using the best technology and amenities, via three institutions at Pratapgarh in Uttar Pradesh. Girls in this location do not receive the kind of education that would help them succeed in life. When girls have equal opportunities to education, then the cycles of poverty are broken, economies grow and their potentials are unleashed. Jagadguru Kripalu Parishat Education offers education (Kindergarten to College level) to underprivileged girls from Pratapgarh and nearby areas, and has till now helped over 55,000 children from these areas receive a good education and lead a good life. Warm jackets and food bowls are provided regularly for school children from Pratapgarh, Vrindavan, and Barsana.

JKP Education has established
 Kripalu Balika Primary School (KBPS), from classes LKG-5,
 Kripalu Balika Intermediate College (KBIC), from classes 6-12 and
 Kripalu Mahila Mahavidyalaya (KMM), offering BA, BSc, MA & BEd.

JKP Social 
The third group is JKP's task of providing social services in as many ways as possible. This is done through the various funds to help widows, the poor, and the underprivileged. For example, in April 2015, JKP distributed clothes and daily necessities to 4000 widows in Vrindavan and in November 2015 more than 5000 Sadhus were provided with valuable everyday necessities.

As of April 2020, 35,000 impoverished people had been given resources by JKP in December 2019 to stay comfortable during winter. The Poor Relief Fund operated under JKP helps giving out warm blankets, jackets, clothing, food items, school bags and resources (benches, chairs etc) and many other necessities to almost 100,000 impoverished individuals every year to Braj residents of Brindavan and Barsana.

Awards
 UP State Mahotsav Award, a State Level Award for charity in health and education, received on 10 January 2015
 Zee Sargam Award, a national level award for social service and education of girls, received on 5 November 2014
 Nelson Mandela Award, a prestigious national award for selfless contribution to society, 19 April 2014 
 Nari Today Award by INext for extraordinary work, remarkable contribution in female education, received in 2013
 Mother Teresa Excellence Award by Economic Growth Society of India for educating girls, received in 2013
 Rajiv Gandhi Excellence Award, noted as India's highest honour for outstanding achievements in charity, in May 2012
 Top 50 Indian Icon award

References

External links
JKP Hospitals
JKP Education

Krishnaite Vaishnava denominations
Hindu organizations
Hindu organisations based in India
Hindu relief organizations
Religious organizations established in 1970
Health charities in India
Educational organisations based in India
Organisations based in Uttar Pradesh
1970 establishments in Uttar Pradesh